Tye Perdido (born November 28, 1988) is a former soccer player who played as a striker.

Born in Maui, Perdido played collegiate soccer at Gonzaga University where he would have a trial with Seattle Sounders. He played in the Premier Development League with Kitsap Pumas before retiring due to a knee injury.

Years later, Perdido joined the Guam national football team for a series of friendly matches.

References

1988 births
Guamanian footballers
Guam international footballers
Association football forwards
Kitsap Pumas players
Living people